CBCA may refer to:

Canada Business Corporations Act, a Canadian law regulating Canadian business corporations
Children's Book Council of Australia, a nonprofit organisation that aims to engage the community with literature for young Australians
Commercial Bank Centrafrique, one of the largest banks in the Central African Republic
Civilian Board of Contract Appeals, the U.S. Civilian Board of Contract Appeals
 Central Blockchain Council of America, is blockchain's very first 3rd party platform agnostic credentialing and standards body.